Swaim is a surname. Notable people with the surname include:

Bob Swaim (born 1943), American film director
Cy Swaim (1874–1945), American baseball player
David G. Swaim (1834–1897), United States Army general
Hardress Nathaniel Swaim (1890–1957), American judge
John Swaim (1949–2013), American politician
Kurt Swaim, American politician
Michael Swaim, American actor, writer, and comedian

See also
Swain (surname)